Ilja Rosendahl (born 23 February 1968) is a German film and music producer, director, screenwriter, actor, songwriter, musician (vocals, guitars, bass) and voiceover artist.

Biography

Artistic career
Rosendahl was born in Bochum. He played in theater projects and sang in a rock band during high school. Since 1997 he has starred in feature films and TV series aired in the United States, Europe and Latin America.

In 2001 he started the American Electronic Alternative Rock solo music project Latent Anxiety in Los Angeles, California which has released 7 studio albums and garnered several awards. He also contributed vocals and guitars to the 2010 Mortal Loom album This Vastness.

In 2021 he gave his debut as director and screenwriter of the short film Remaining Chance.

Academic background
Rosendahl holds a PhD and BSc in Natural Science with specialization in Radiation Biophysics, Cytology and Genetics and speaks 7 languages (German, English, Spanish, Portuguese, Italian, French, Russian).

Filmography

Feature films

TV series

Dubbing

Discography

Studio albums

Audiobooks

Awards and nominations

References

External links

 
 

1968 births
Living people
People from Bochum
German film producers
German record producers
German male film actors
German male television actors
German male musicians
German male singers
German guitarists
German bass guitarists
Male bass guitarists
German male voice actors
20th-century German male actors
21st-century German male actors
Film people from North Rhine-Westphalia
German male guitarists
German screenwriters
German male screenwriters
German film directors